Chowdhury Kamal Ibne Yousuf (1940 – 9 December 2020) was a Bangladeshi politician who served as government minister. He was a leader of Bangladesh Nationalist Party.

Family
Yusuf was born into a Bengali Zamindar family from Faridpur district. His grandfather was the zamindar Chowdhury Moyezuddin Biwshash. His father, Yusuf Ali Chowdhury (Mohan Mia), was a Muslim League leader during British rule and in Pakistan who supported Pakistan during the Bangladesh Liberation war. His uncle Chowdhury Abdallah Zaheeruddin (Lal Mia) had been a cabinet minister in the government of President Ayub Khan while another uncle, Enayet Hossain Chowdhury, became a member of the National Assembly of Pakistan.

Career
Yusuf joined the Bangladesh Nationalist Party (BNP) led by President Ziaur Rahman after the party's formation in 1979. He was elected to parliament in the 1979 election. In 1981 he was inducted as a minister in the government of President Justice Abdus Sattar. In 1991 he was elected again and was made a Minister for Health in the cabinet of Prime Minister Begum Khaleda Zia. He won the general elections in 1996 even though the BNP lost power to the Awami League. He also won the 2001 elections after which he was made Minister for Food and Disaster Management. He lost his seat in the 2008 general elections. He was the vice-chairman of BNP.

Personal life and death
Yusuf had a daughter, Chowdhury Naiab Yusuf. He died from COVID-19 during the COVID-19 pandemic in Bangladesh.

References

External links
 World Food Programme Report on food security in Bangladesh

1940 births
2020 deaths
People from Faridpur District
Bangladesh Nationalist Party politicians
5th Jatiya Sangsad members
7th Jatiya Sangsad members
8th Jatiya Sangsad members
Disaster Management and Relief ministers of Bangladesh
Food ministers of Bangladesh
Place of birth missing
Deaths from the COVID-19 pandemic in Bangladesh
St. Gregory's High School and College alumni